National Disaster Management Act, 2010 was passed by Parliament of Pakistan in 2010, it received the assent of the President on 8 December 2010. The Act applies to whole Pakistan including tribal areas of FATA. The Act was passed in backdrop of 2010 Floods in Pakistan and strengthen Disaster Management system.

National Disaster Management Commission  
The Act created a National Disaster Management Commission whose responsible for laying down the policies, plans and guidelines for disaster management.

National Disaster Management Authority 

The federal authority mandated to deal with whole spectrum of disasters and their management in the country.

Provincial Disaster Management Commission 
The article 13 of the Act, Provincial Disaster Management Commissions in all provinces were established. The Provincial Commissions have the responsibility of laying down policies and plans for disaster management in the province.

Provincial Disaster Management Authority 
Provincial Authorities are responsible for implementing policies and plans for Disaster Management in the Province. Provincial Authorities were created under article 15
Each province has its own Disaster management authority:
 Provincial Disaster Management Authority (Balochistan)
 Provincial Disaster Management Authority (Khyber Pakhtunkhwa)
 Provincial Disaster Management Authority (Punjab) 
 Provincial Disaster Management Authority (Sindh)
 State Disaster Management Authority (Azad Jammu & Kashmir)
 Gilgit Baltistan Disaster Management Authority

District Disaster Management Authority 
Under the act each District Disaster Management Authority are established in each of the districts. District Authority shall be as the district planning, coordinating and implementing body for disaster management and take all measures for the purposes of disaster management in the districts in accordance with the guidelines laid down by the National Authority and the Provincial Authority.

See also 
 National Disaster Management Authority
 State Disaster Management Authority
 2010 Pakistan floods
 2005 Kashmir earthquake

References

External links
 NDMA

Emergency management in Pakistan
Acts of the Parliament of Pakistan